Ronald Henry George Griffin (18 October 1919 – February 1987) was an English professional football outside right who played in the Scottish League for St Mirren. He also made one appearance in the Football League for Lincoln City.

Career statistics

References

English footballers
Brentford F.C. players
Scottish Football League players
Association football outside forwards
Place of death missing
Larkhall Thistle F.C. players
St Mirren F.C. players
Lincoln City F.C. players
Footballers from Camberwell
1919 births
1987 deaths
English Football League players